The Golden Bed is a 1925 American silent drama film directed by Cecil B. DeMille. It is based on the novel Tomorrow's Bread by Wallace Irwin. Jeanie MacPherson wrote the screenplay.

Plot
As described in a review in a film magazine, even as a child golden-haired Flora Lee Peake (Rich) attracted the opposite sex. Little Admah Holtz (La Rocque), peddling candy, would give her some of his wares. She sleeps on a golden bed adorned with swans that her parents pampered her with. When she grew up, her father (Walthall) used his last dollar to bring about her marriage to the Marquis de San Pilar (Kosloff), while her younger sister Margaret (Reynolds) went to work assisting Admah, who now owns a candy store. Soon after, the Marquis found Flora submitting to the embrace of the Duc (Cain). On a mountain climb the Marquis and Duc fight on a snow covered ledge atop a glacier, and the Marquis cuts the rope so that they both fall to their death in a crevasse. Flora returns home and soon has ensnared Abmah, now a wealthy man. Her extravagance brings him near to ruin. To satisfy her, he throws a ball where all the decorations are made from candy, but he has used some of the firm's funds. Admah is arrested for this and is sent to prison for five years. Margaret, who loves Admah, remains true and buys and operates the store, while Flora runs off with Bunny O'Neill (Baxter). Bunny throws her down and, now a wreck, returns to her old home, now a boarding house, and goes to her room with its famous golden bed. Admah, released from prison, also returns to the home and Flora dies in his arms. Going to his old store he finds Margaret waiting, and they start life anew.

Cast

Preservation
A print of The Golden Bed survives in the film archive at George Eastman House.

References

External links

Stills at cecilbdemille.com
Press sheet for The Golden Bed at the Library of Congress

1925 films
1925 drama films
Silent American drama films
American silent feature films
American black-and-white films
Films directed by Cecil B. DeMille
1920s American films
1920s English-language films